The National Employees' Trade Union (NETU) was a trade union representing workers in various industries, principally relating to engineering, in South Africa.

The union was founded on 1 August 1995, when the Amalgamated Engineering Union of South Africa merged with the Engineering, Industrial and Mining Workers' Union, the Iron Moulders' Society of South Africa, and the South African Boilermakers' Society.  On formation, it had 66,000 members, but this fell rapidly, many employees transferring to the rival Solidarity union.  It was down to 26,000 members by 2003.  In April 2003, it merged into the United Association of South Africa.

References

Engineering trade unions
Trade unions established in 1995
Trade unions disestablished in 2003
Trade unions in South Africa